Two Rivers High School is a high school located in Two Rivers, Wisconsin. It was built in 2001 to replace the former Washington High School in downtown Two Rivers. The school is located at 4519 Lincoln Avenue Wisconsin Highway 42 on the outskirts of Two Rivers. The school athletically takes part in the Eastern Wisconsin Conference. Conference rivals include Roncalli High School, Kiel High School, and Valders High School. A total of 24 Credits and 25 Community Service Hours are required in order to graduate from the school.

Two Rivers High is ranked 355-457th within Wisconsin. Students have the opportunity to take Advanced Placement coursework and exams. The AP participation rate at Two Rivers High is 3%. The total minority enrollment is 14%, and 30% of students are economically disadvantaged. Two Rivers High is the only high school in the Two Rivers Public School District. Notable alum Jordan Steckler currently playing in NFL for the Houston Texans.

References

External links
 Two Rivers High School, U.S. News & World Report.
 
  

Educational institutions established in 2001
Public high schools in Wisconsin
Schools in Manitowoc County, Wisconsin
2001 establishments in Wisconsin